Aechmea fendleri is a species of bromeliad in the genus Aechmea. This species is native to Venezuela and Trinidad and Tobago.

Cultivars
The species is widely cultivated as an ornamental. Cultivars include:

 Aechmea 'Blue Beauty'
 Aechmea 'Flamingo'
 Aechmea 'Foster's Freckles'
 Aechmea 'Lilac Cloud'
 Aechmea 'Pink Rocket'
 Aechmea 'Purple Velvet'
 Aechmea 'Romero'
 Aechmea 'Royanne'
 Aechmea 'Shelldancer'
 Aechmea 'Spring Beauty'
 × Canmea 'Carmin'
 × Ursumea 'Ma Williams'

References

fendleri
Flora of Trinidad and Tobago
Flora of Venezuela
Plants described in 1896
Flora without expected TNC conservation status